St. Oliver Plunkett's is a Gaelic Athletic Association club in Cork, Ireland. The club is based in Ahiohill. It fields teams in hurling and Gaelic football competitions organized by Cork GAA and the Carbery divisional board.

History
The club was founded in 1974, and named after Saint Oliver Plunkett whose canonization was announced that year. This was not the first club in Ahiohill and there are records of games played by Ahiohill as early as the famine in 1840s. The underage club was known as Assumption Rovers. On 28 August 2011, Plunketts won their first West Cork Junior A Hurling Championship beating Dohenys in the Final with a score of 2-15 to 0-12. Kevin Coffey was Man of the Match scoring 8 points.

Honours
 Cork Junior B Hurling Championship Winner (1) 2002  Runner-Up 1999
 Cork Junior B Football Championship Winner  (1) 1990, 2007
 Cork Minor C Football Championship Runner-Up 1999
 Cork Minor C Hurling Championship Winner (3) 2002, 2004, 2006
 West Cork Junior A Hurling Championship Winner (1) 2011 
 West Cork Junior A Football Championship Runner-Up 2009, 2012
 West Cork Junior B Hurling Championship Winner (4) 1990, 1997, 1999, 2002  Runner-Up 1988, 1992, 1994, 1995, 1996
 West Cork Junior B Football Championship Winner (3) 1986, 1990, 2007  Runner-Up 1978, 1979, 1998, 2006
 West Cork Junior C Hurling Championship Winner (2) 1988, 1995
 West Cork Minor B Football Championship Runner-Up 1985 (Assumption Rovers)
 West Cork Minor C Hurling Championship Winner (3) 2002, 2004, 2006
 West Cork Minor C Football Championship Winner (2) 1999, 2002  Runner-Up 1997, 2005
 West Cork Under-21 B Hurling Championship Winner (1) 2005  Runner-Up 1988, 1990, 2003
 West Cork Under-21 B Football Championship Winner (1) 2009  Runner-Up 1988
 West Cork Under-21 B Hurling Championship Winner (3) 1996, 2001, 2002  Runner-Up 2000
 West Cork Under-21 C Football Championship Winner (1) 2002  Runner-Up 1997, 1998, 2000, 2001, 2012

External links
Official St. Oliver Plunketts Club website

References

Hurling clubs in County Cork
Gaelic football clubs in County Cork
Gaelic games clubs in County Cork